Cadillac Sky is a Progressive Bluegrass group based in Nashville, Tennessee. Their debut album "Blind Man Walking" is widely considered to be one of the greatest albums in Progressive Bluegrass music. The band is currently on an "indefinite hiatus".

History
Cadillac Sky was founded in Texas and recorded their first album, Blind Man Walking, in 2006, including mainly traditional bluegrass tunes. The band members at that time were Matt Menefee (Banjo), Ross Holmes (Violin),  Bryan Simpson (mandolin), Mike Jump (guitar, vocals), and Matt Blaize (bass, vocals).

In 2008, the band played at the Panhandle Bluegrass Festival in Hedgesville, West Virginia, and released an album, Gravity's Our Enemy.

Mandolin player and singer Bryan Simpson left the band in the middle of a tour in 2010, and was replaced by guitarist Levi Lowrey. That year the band played at Merlefest and guitarist David Mayfield joined the band.

The band's third album, Letters in the Deep combined elements of blues, rock country and jazz with some more traditional bluegrass numbers. Most of the songs are written by members of the band.

At the time the band members decided to go their separate ways in 2011, the lineup consisted of Matt Menefee, Ross Holmes, Levi Lowrey, David Mayfield, and Andy "The Panda" Moritz (Bass).

Discography

Albums

Music videos

References

Musical groups from Nashville, Tennessee
American bluegrass music groups
Progressive bluegrass music groups